Józef Andrzej Grzesiak, codename Czarny (11 November 1900 in Kraków – 18 September 1975 in Gdańsk, Poland), was a Polish Scoutmaster (harcmistrz). As were the majority of Polish Scoutmasters during the Second World War, he was also a member of the AK-Szare Szeregi resistance organization.

References 

Polish resistance members of World War II
Polish Scouts and Guides
1900 births
1975 deaths